Ge with caron is a letter of the Cyrillic script. It is used in the Shughni and Wakhi languages. It makes the  sound.